The 1978 USC Trojans football team represented the University of Southern California in the 1978 NCAA Division I-A football season. Following the season, the Trojans were crowned national champions according to the Coaches Poll.  While Alabama claimed the AP Poll title because it had defeated top-ranked Penn State in the Sugar Bowl, the Trojans felt they deserved the title since they had defeated Alabama and Notre Dame during the regular season, and then Michigan in the Rose Bowl. Both USC and Alabama ended their seasons with a single loss.

Schedule
The Trojans finished the regular season with an 11–1 record before going on to defeat the Michigan Wolverines 17–10 in the Rose Bowl.

Personnel

Game summaries

Notre Dame

Rose Bowl

1978 Trojans in the NFL
All 22 starters played in the NFL.

Marcus Allen
Chip Banks
Lynn Cain
Rich Dimler
Ronnie Lott
Anthony Muñoz
Charles White
Brad Budde
Garry Cobb
Larry Braziel
Paul McDonald
Riki Gray
Ray Butler
Steve Busick
Keith Van Horne
Dennis Smith

Allen, Lott, and Muñoz are the only three starters on the team enshrined in the Pro Football Hall of Fame.

Awards and honors
Charles White: Heisman trophy, Maxwell Award, Walter Camp Award, UPI Player of the Year

References

USC
USC Trojans football seasons
College football national champions
Pac-12 Conference football champion seasons
Rose Bowl champion seasons
USC Trojans football